Valda Jackson (born c. 1959) is a Jamaican-British painter, sculptor and writer.

Life
Valda Jackson was born in Saint Thomas Parish, Jamaica. In 1964, aged five, she moved to England with her two sisters to join her parents. The family lived near Birmingham. At school in the 1960s and 1970s, she experienced racism from teachers and pupils. She only studied art after leaving school, attending evening classes at Birmingham's Bournville College of Art to gain A-Levels in art and art history. In 1986 she moved to Bristol to study at Bower Ashton College of Art and Design, where she was the only Black student studying fine art in her year. She has continued to live in Bristol.

Jackson is a member of the Royal Society of Sculptors, and has exhibited throughout the United Kingdom. Her first exhibition was at Bristol's Malcolm X Centre.  In 1992 and 1993 she was a prize-winner at the Millfield Open Show, and she has also exhibited work at the National Portrait Gallery. Her public art sculptures include Mare and Foal (1995), a life-size carving in Newmarket, and a 2000 sculpture of a steam engine at Station Approach in Newport City Centre. In 2002 she created a relief artwork, All Our Tomorrows, for the new Family and Learning Centre in St Pauls.

She has a studio at Spike Island Artspace. In 2016 she and other writers collaborated with scientists from Bristol University in Literary Archaeology, a project to re-imagine the lives of enslaved people using the material evidence of their skeletal remains.

Her public art collaborations with the sculptor and printmaker Rodney Harris include four brick relief artworks for the Peabody estate in St. John Hill's, Clapham, which won the Public Monuments and Sculpture Association Marsh Award special prize for Excellence in Public Sculpture.

Jackson has worked as a tutor at Cardiff School of Art and Design, and lectured in fine art at the University of Central England. She has also worked with several schools and colleges in South West England.

Windrush monument shortlist
In 2021 Jackson was one of the four shortlisted artists to create a new monument to the Windrush generation at Waterloo Station, a commission later won by the sculptor Basil Watson. Jackson's proposal, presented for public consultation in July 2021, was for three scattered bronze figures on a raised platform. Two standing adults and one small child would have symbolised the diverse experiences of migrants to the United Kingdom, with space between the figures to emphasise the ambiguity of separation and migration, as well as inviting onlookers and passers to pause and sit in that space themselves:

Writing
 "One Sunday Morning in May 1971". Shortlisted for BBC Radio 4 ''Opening Lines', 2015.
 "An Age of Reason (Coming Here)", in 
 "How I Feel" (poem), 2016.

References

External links
 Valda Jackson's website
 Website of Valda Jackson and Rodney Harris

Year of birth missing (living people)
Living people
Artists from Bristol
Black British artists
British poets
British sculptors
British short story writers
Jamaican emigrants to the United Kingdom
People from Saint Thomas Parish, Jamaica
1950s births